The 1909 Major League Baseball season was contested from April 12 to October 16, 1909. The Pittsburgh Pirates and Detroit Tigers were the regular season champions of the National League and American League, respectively. The Pirates then defeated the Tigers in the World Series, four games to three.

In the National League, the Chicago Cubs had a record of 104–49, but finished  games behind the Pirates, setting a record for the most wins in an MLB regular season without reaching the postseason, which has only been equalled once, by the 1942 Brooklyn Dodgers, who had a record of 104–50.

MLB statistical leaders

Standings

American League

National League

Postseason

Bracket

Managers

American League

National League

Events
August 28 – Dolly Gray of the Washington Senators walks eight batters in an inning.

References

External links
1909 Major League Baseball season schedule at Baseball Reference
1909 in baseball history from ThisGreatGame.com

 
Major League Baseball seasons